This is a timeline documenting events of Jazz in the year 2010.

Events

January 
 29 – The 5th Ice Music Festival started in Geilo, Norway (January 29 – 31).

February
 3 – The 13th Polarjazz Festival started in Longyearbyen, Svalbard (February 3–7).

March
 5 – The 6th Jakarta International Java Jazz Festival started in Jakarta, Indonesia (March 5–7).
 26 The 37th Vossajazz started in Voss, Norway (April 26–28).
 27 Stein Urheim was awarded Vossajazzprisen 2010.
 27 Karin Krog and John Surman performs the commissioned work Songs about this and that for Vossajazz 2010.

April
 28 – The 16th SoddJazz started in Inderøy, Norway (April 28 - May 2).

May
 21 – The 39th Moers Festival started in Moers, Germany (May 21 – 24).
 26 – The 38th Nattjazz started in Bergen, Norway (May 26 - June 7).

June
 10 – The 27th Stockholm Jazz Festival started in Stockholm, Sweden (June 10 – 12).
 25 – The 30th Montreal International Jazz Festival started in Montreal, Quebec, Canada (June 25 - July 6).
 30 – The 22nd Jazz Fest Wien started in Vienna, Austria (June 30 – July 9).

July
 2
 The 32nd Copenhagen Jazz Festival started in Copenhagen, Denmark (July 2 – 11).
 The 44th Montreux Jazz Festival started in Montreux, Switzerland (July 2 – 17).
 7 – The 46th Kongsberg Jazzfestival started in Kongsberg, Norway (July 7 – 11).
 9 – The 35th North Sea Jazz Festival started in The Hague, Netherlands (July 9 – 11).
 16 – The 45th Pori Jazz Festival started in Pori, Finland (July 16 – 25).
 17 – The 63rd Nice Jazz Festival started in Nice, France (July 17 – 24).
 19 – The 50th Moldejazz started in Molde, Norway (July 19–24).
 20 – The 45th San Sebastian Jazz Festival started in San Sebastian, Spain (July 20 – 25).

August
 6
 The 54th Newport Jazz Festival started in Newport, Rhode Island (August 6 – 8).
 The 26th Brecon Jazz Festival started in Brecon, Wales (August 6 – 8).
 11 – The 24th Sildajazz starts in Haugesund, Norway (August 11–15).
 16 – The 25th Oslo Jazzfestival started in Oslo, Norway (August 16 – 22).

September
 2 – The 6th Punktfestivalen started in Kristiansand, Norway (September 2 – 4).
 17 – The 53rd Monterey Jazz Festival started in Monterey, California (September 17 – 19).

October

November
 12 – The 19th London Jazz Festival started in London, England (November 12 – 21).

December

Album released

January

February

March

April

May

June

July

August

September

October

November

December

Unknown date
#

A
 Atomic – Theater Tilters Vol 1.
 Atomic – Theater Tilters Vol 2.

E
 Eple Trio – In The Clearing / In The Cavern.

H
 Daniel Herskedal – City Stories.

V
 Very Much Alive by Paolo Vinaccia featuring Terje Rypdal, Ståle Storløkken and Palle Mikkelborg.

Deaths

 January
 3 – Joyce Collins, American pianist, singer, and educator (born 1930).
 10 – Dick Johnson, American big band clarinetist (born 1925).
 11 – Georgy Garanian, Armenian-Russian saxophonist, bandleader, and composer (born 1934).
 13 – Ed Thigpen, American drummer, Oscar Peterson Trio (born 1930).
 16 – Jimmy Wyble, American guitarist (born 1922).
 17 – Maki Asakawa, Japanese jazz and blues singer, lyricist and composer (born 1942).
 19 – Ian Christie, English clarinettist (born 1927).
 23 – Earl Wild, American pianist (born 1915).
 25 – Jane Jarvis, American pianist (born 1915).

 February
 6
 John Dankworth, English saxophonist, clarinettist and composer (born 1927).
 Roger Guérin, French trumpeter and singer (born 1926).
 12 – Jake Hanna, American jazz drummer (born 1931).
 13 – Jamil Nasser, American bassist, and tubist (born 1932).
 15 – Art Van Damme, American accordionist (born 1920).

 March
 7 – Tony Campise, American saxophonist (born 1943).
 15 – Sam Mtukudzi, Zimbabwean saxophonist and guitarist (born 1988).
 20 – Erwin Lehn, German composer, bandleader, and musician (born 1919).
 22 – Diz Disley, Anglo-Canadian guitarist (born 1931).
 23 – Marva Wright, American blues singer (born 1948).
 27 – Peter Herbolzheimer, German trombonist and bandleader (born 1935).
 28 – Herb Ellis, American guitarist (born 1921).
 29 – Luigi Trussardi, French upright bassist (born 1938).
 30 – John Bunch, American pianist (born 1921).

 April
 2 – Mike Zwerin, American musician and author (born 1930).
 7
 Eddie Johnson, American tenor saxophonist (born 1920).
 Graciela, Afro-Cuban singer (born 1915).
 11 – Julia Tsenova, Bulgarian composer, pianist, and musical pedagogue (born 1948).
 13 – Steve Reid, American drummer (born 1944).

 May
 1
 Jesse Drakes, American trumpeter (born 1924).
 Rob McConnell, Canadian jazz trombonist, composer, and arranger (born 1935).
 7 – Francisco Aguabella, Afro-Cuban percussionist (born 1925).
 9 – Lena Horne, American singer (born 1917).
 16 – Hank Jones, American pianist, bandleader, arranger, and composer (born 1918).
 30 – Kristian Bergheim, Norwegian saxophonist (born 1926).

 June
 5 – Danny Bank, American saxophonist, clarinetist, and flautist (born 1922).
 9
 Harold Ivory Williams Jr., American keyboardist (born 1949).
 Paul Moer, American pianist (born 1916).
 15 – Wendell Logan, American composer (born 1940).
 16 – Bill Dixon, American trumpeter, flugelhornist, pianist, composer, and visual artist (born 1925).
 24 – Fred Anderson, American tenor saxophonist (born 1929).
 26 – Benny Powell, African-American jazz trombonist (born 1930).
 28 – Joya Sherrill, American singer and children's television show host (born 1924).

 July
 8
 Lelio Luttazzi, Italian composer, musician, actor, singer, and conductor (born 1923).
 Valdo Williams, Canadian pianist (born 1928).
 14 – Gene Ludwig, American organist (born 1937).
 22
 Dick Buckley, American radio presenter (born 1924).
 Harry Beckett, British trumpeter and flugelhornist (born 1935).
 23 – Willem Breuker, Dutch bandleader, composer, arranger, saxophonist, and clarinetist (born 1944).
 29 – Martin Drew, English drummer (born 1944).

 August
 8 – Jack Parnell, English producer, bandleader, drummer, and pianist (born 1923).
 11 – Leon Breeden, clarinetist, American saxophonist, composer, and arranger (born 1921).
 14 – Abbey Lincoln, American singer (born 1930).
 15 – Ahmad Alaadeen, American saxophonist (born 1934).
 19 – Dick Maloney, Canadian singer and radio host (born 1933).

 September
 8 – Hadley Caliman, American saxophonist and flautist (born 1932).
 11 – Gunnar Hoffsten, Swedish composer, bandleader, trumpeter, and pianist (born 1923).
 14 – Alf Kjellman, Norwegian saxophonist (born 1938).
 19 – Buddy Collette, American flautist, saxophonist, and clarinetist (born 1921).
 27
 Buddy Morrow, American trombonist and bandleader (born 1919).
 Ed Wiley Jr., American tenor saxophonist (born 1930).

 October
 7 – T Lavitz, American keyboardist, composer and producer (born 1956).
 17 – Dennis Taylor, American saxophonist, clarinet, and arranger (born 1953).
 18 – Marion Brown, American jazz alto saxophonist and ethnomusicologist (born 1939).
 28
 Jack Brokensha, Australian-American vibraphonist (born 1926).
 Walter Payton, American bassist and sousaphonist (born 1942).

 November
 16 – Mimi Perrin, French pianist and singer, and translator (born 1926).
 30 – Monty Sunshine, English clarinettist (born 1928).

 December
 9 – James Moody, American saxophonist (cancer) (born 1925).
 14 – Elisa Gabbai, Israeli singer (born 1933).
 17
 Captain Beefheart, American singer (born 1941).
 Lina Romay, Mexican-American actress and singer (born 1919).
 19 – Trudy Pitts, American soul jazz keyboardist (born 1932).
 28 – Billy Taylor, American pianist (born 1921).

See also

 List of 2010 albums
 List of years in jazz
 2010s in jazz
 2010 in music

References

External links 
 History Of Jazz Timeline: 2010 at All About Jazz

2010s in jazz
Jazz